Paul Douglass (1905–1988) was president of American University from 1941 until 1952. His ascent to the office marked a change in the title from Chancellor to President. Douglass was a graduate of Wesleyan University and received masters and doctoral degrees from the University of Cincinnati. He was also an adviser to Syngman Rhee, President of South Korea, from 1952 to 1956 and a member of the Vermont Legislature from 1933 to 1941.

Notes

Wesleyan University alumni
Leaders of American University
1905 births
1988 deaths
University of Cincinnati alumni
20th-century American academics